Sciodrepoides alpestris is a species of beetle in the Leiodidae family that can be found in such European countries as Austria, Belarus, Bosnia and Herzegovina, Czech Republic, Finland, Italy, Poland, Romania, Slovakia, and Oriental region.

References

External links
Sciodrepoides alpestris 

alpestris
Beetles described in 1934
Beetles of Europe